Óscar David Suazo Velázquez (born 5 November 1979) is a Honduran retired professional footballer turned coach who played as a striker.

Suazo played more than 300 league games and scored over 90 league goals in Italy during a span of 7 years.

Club career

Early career
Nicknamed La Pantera (The Panther) or El Rey David (The King David), Suazo was born in San Pedro Sula. In his early career, he developed alongside his cousin, Maynor Suazo, who also went on to play for the Honduras national football team. Suazo took his first steps at Olimpia Reserves and later went on to play at the Liga Bancaria. After his participation in 1999 FIFA World Youth Championship, he was acquired by domestic club team Olimpia. He continued to impress playing for Olimpia's youth system under the coaching of the late Angel Ramón Paz ("Mon Paz") and earned a spot on the top squad before turning 20 years old.

Cagliari
Óscar Tabárez, then-coach of Italian side Cagliari, was impressed by Suazo's performance and did not hesitate in bringing him to Europe, for US$2 million transfer fee and US$200,000 tax to National Autonomous Federation of Football of Honduras, as well as 15–20% of the future capital gain if Cagliari sold the player above the US$2.2M price tag. Suazo officially joined the club ahead of the 1999–2000 Serie A season. In his first year with the team, he scored one goal in 13 league appearances, and at the end of the 1999–2000 season, Cagliari were relegated to Serie B, where they would remain until the 2003–04 season. In four years in Serie B, Suazo played 113 matches and scored 40 goals for the club. His scoring efficiency was impressive enough for him to earn the nickname La Pantera (the Panther). Suazo's time in Serie B provided him with great experience which would help ease his transition into more difficult competition at the top of the Italian Lega Calcio.

In the 2004–05 Serie A season, Suazo scored seven goals in 22 matches in a 4–3–3 scheme in which he performed as a reserve behind Gianfranco Zola, Mauro Esposito and Antonio Langella. Suazo's scoring proved vital in helping Cagliari avoid relegation and impressed top clubs across Europe, despite only scoring six goals. In 2006, he became a starter for Cagliari and scored 22 goals in Serie A. For his play that season, Suazo was honoured with the Serie A Foreign Footballer of the Year, which he shared with Milan's Kaká. In 2007, Suazo continued his great play for Cagliari, where he scored 18 more goals in the Serie A and helped save Cagliari from another relegation to Serie B. During his spell with Cagliari, Suazo was known for his attacking partnership with both Langella and Esposito.

Internazionale
On 13 June 2007, reports arose that Suazo had agreed terms with Serie A champions Internazionale. Six days later, however, crosstown rivals and reigning European champions Milan announced that they themselves had acquired Suazo. While Milan claimed they had successfully negotiated with Cagliari, the deal with Inter was confirmed by Cagliari chairman Massimo Cellino. Meanwhile, one of Suazo's agents, Carlo Pallavicino, added to the confusion by saying, "Suazo has not had any contact with Milan and he still has not given his consent to the transfer." It was later announced that Suazo was confirmed with Inter on 26 June for €14 million fee (with about US$2.5 million was required to pay by Cagliari to Olimpia) after Milan officially withdrew their contract offer. Since Suazo himself wanted to keep his initial agreement with Inter. "It was an issue of respect. The Rossoneri (nickname of Milan) understood that I had a promise with coach Roberto Mancini, Marco Branca and chairman Massimo Moratti." He scored his first Inter goal against Genoa and scored a total of eight goals throughout his first season with the Nerazzurri (the nickname of Inter).

Loans
After a less-than-impressive first season with Inter, Suazo was loaned to Portuguese club Benfica for the 2008–09 season. Suazo however, appeared in just 12 league matches and scored just four goals during the season. Following his return to Inter in June 2009, he was given limited squad space and failed to make any starts for his club.

On 29 December 2009 it was confirmed that Suazo had been authorized to play friendly match for Genoa, two days before the opening of the winter transfer window. After the opening of the transfer window, Suazo officially joined Genoa on a six-month loan deal, where he replaced Sergio Floccari, who was transferred to Lazio on 4 January. This was part of a deal that completed a three-way, three-man swap in which Inter also received Goran Pandev from Lazio on free transfer.

Suazo made his debut for Genoa against Milan in a losing effort, appearing on the scoresheet in the process. He scored the second goal for Genoa and was eventually substituted in the 80th minute for Hernán Crespo. His loan with Genoa proved to be highly unsuccessful, as the player scored a mere 2 goals in 16 Serie A appearances.

Return to Inter
After his Genoa loan expired, Suazo returned to Inter but, in part because of a long-term injury, he was not included in the first-team, thus failing to make a single appearance in the entire 2010–11 season. Suazo's contract with Inter expired on 30 June 2011, leaving the player without a contract. Since then, he was linked with a comeback at Cagliari following a trial period. This was a possibility that was later confirmed by club chairman Massimo Cellino, who, on 13 July 2011, confirmed Suazo's return to Sardinia by the end of the transfer window, and defined his signing as "a cherry on the pie". The transfer, however, collapsed after Suazo was asked to leave Cagliari's pre-season camp after Cellino opted against the move and changed his decision about the transfer.

Catania

On 12 August 2011, Suazo signed for Catania on a one-year deal. He was officially presented on the same day alongside new arrivals Mario Paglialunga and Davide Lanzafame. Suazo was assigned the number 9 jersey, though only would make six appearances during his time in Sicily, which ended upon the expiration of his contract on 30 June 2012.

On 27 March 2013, at the age of 33, he announced his retirement from football, due to his persisting struggles with knee injuries.

International career
Suazo played for the Honduras national under-20 football team at the 1999 FIFA World Youth Championship. He made his senior debut for Honduras in a May 1999 friendly match against Haiti and has earned a total of 57 caps, scoring 17 goals. He has represented his country in 30 FIFA World Cup qualification matches and at the 2010 FIFA World Cup. He also played at the 2000 Summer Olympics and at the 2003 UNCAF Nations Cup as well as at the 2003 CONCACAF Gold Cup. He also played a few minutes of Honduras' first match at the 2001 Copa América.

His final international appearance came on 12 June 2012, in a 2014 FIFA World Cup qualifying match against Canada.

Post-playing and coaching career
Following his retirement as a player, Suazo was hired by his former team Cagliari as a scout. In 2014, he joined the first team coaching staff as an assistant to Ivo Pulga for the final part of the season; he successively was appointed to the same role by the end of the 2014–15 season, supporting new head coach Gianluca Festa.

For the 2015–16 season, he was named new youth team coach for the Giovanissimi Nazionali.

On 5 June 2018 he was appointed manager of Serie B side Brescia by Massimo Cellino, former chairman of his while at Cagliari. He was however sacked on 18 September 2018 after a negative start to the new season.

On 13 May 2021, Suazo returned into management as the new head coach of struggling Sardinian Serie D side Carbonia. After guiding Carbonia to safety, on 31 July 2021 he agreed a two-year contract extension with the club. On 24 June 2022, Carbonia and Suazo parted ways, following the team's relegation to Eccellenza at the end of the 2021–22 Serie D season.

Style of play
A quick and physically strong striker, Suazo is considered to be one of the greatest players Honduras has ever produced. His main characteristic as a forward was his incredible speed, both on and off the ball, which made him arguably one of the fastest Serie A players of his time. His pace and acceleration made him a dangerous offensive threat on counter-attacks and allowed him to create space and provide depth to his team with his runs from behind. In spite of his ability, however, he was often injury prone throughout his career. He also possessed notable determination and great leadership skills on the pitch, serving as Cagliari's captain. Suazo also took several penalties and occasionally scored from free kicks.

Personal life
David's brothers are Nicolás and Ruben Suazo. Former internationals Maynor Suazo and Hendry Thomas are his cousins. He holds Italian nationality due to his marriage to an Italian woman, Elisa Secchi, in 2005. They have two sons, David Edoardo and Luis Gabriel, with the latter (born 2008) having followed on his father's footsteps and having been signed by Juventus in 2022, joining the Under-15 team.

Career statistics

Club

International goals

Honours

Club
Olimpia
Honduran Liga Nacional: 1998–99
Honduran Super Copa: 1996–97
Honduran Cup: 1998

Internazionale
Serie A: 2007–08, 2009–10
Supercoppa Italiana: 2010
Coppa Italia: 2009–10
UEFA Champions League: 2009–10

Benfica
Taça da Liga: 2008–09

International
Honduras
CONCACAF Men's Olympic Qualifying Tournament: 2000

Individual
Serie A Foreign Footballer of the Year: 2006

References

External links

 
 

1979 births
Living people
People from San Pedro Sula
Naturalised citizens of Italy
Italian people of Honduran descent
Association football forwards
Garifuna people
Honduran footballers
Honduras international footballers
Footballers at the 2000 Summer Olympics
Olympic footballers of Honduras
2001 Copa América players
2003 UNCAF Nations Cup players
2003 CONCACAF Gold Cup players
2010 FIFA World Cup players
C.D. Olimpia players
Cagliari Calcio players
Inter Milan players
S.L. Benfica footballers
Genoa C.F.C. players
Catania S.S.D. players
Honduran expatriate footballers
Honduran expatriate sportspeople in Italy
Expatriate footballers in Italy
Expatriate footballers in Portugal
Liga Nacional de Fútbol Profesional de Honduras players
Serie A players
Serie B players
Primeira Liga players
Brescia Calcio managers
Honduran football managers